Prayer to the East is an album by multi-instrumentalist Yusef Lateef recorded in 1957 and released on the Savoy label.

The title track was composed by Ali Jackson, drummer Oliver Jackson's brother.

Reception

The Allmusic site stated: "Prayer to the East by Yusef Lateef remains a seemingly blessed moment of creative interaction between American modern jazz and the music of the so-called Arab East".

Track listing 
All compositions by Yusef Lateef except as indicated
 "A Night in Tunisia" (Dizzy Gillespie) - 9:55
 "Endura" (Yusef Lateef) - 13:10
 "Prayer to the East" (Ali Jackson)  - 8:19
 "Love Dance" (Les Baxter) - 6:46
 "Lover Man" (Jimmy Davis, Ram Ramirez, James Sherman) - 6:37

Personnel 
Yusef Lateef - tenor saxophone, flute, tracks 3 and 4, tambourine
Wilbur Harden - flugelhorn
Hugh Lawson - piano, ocarina
Ernie Farrow - bass
Oliver Jackson - drums, gong

References 

Yusef Lateef albums
1958 albums
Albums produced by Ozzie Cadena
Albums recorded at Van Gelder Studio
Savoy Records albums